The 1998 Nova Scotia general election was held on March 24, 1998 to elect members of the 57th House of Assembly of the Province of Nova Scotia, Canada. The Liberal party and the New Democratic Party tied in the seat count, with 19 each, while the Progressive Conservatives won 14 seats. The Liberals went on to form a minority government with the support of the Progressive Conservatives.

Background
Liberal Premier John Savage was elected in a landslide in 1993. The Liberals inherited a $471-million deficit, and launched an austerity program which cut the province's health and education systems. On April 1, 1997, the provincial government imposed a 15% Harmonized Sales Tax (HST) which merged the Provincial Sales Tax (PST) and the Goods and Services Tax (GST). This shift angered some Nova Scotians who now had to pay taxes on things that had previously been exempted, such as home heating fuel. Savage also implemented an unpopular highway toll. Liberal party infighting eventually resulted in Savage's resignation in July 1997. Russell MacLellan became Premier of Nova Scotia on July 18, 1997.

Campaign
The governing Liberals were desperate to distance themselves from the Savage government which was viewed as deeply unpopular. New leader, Russell MacLellan, was made the focus of the campaign with all Liberal candidates signs displaying the phrase, "the MacLellan Liberals."

During a televised debate on March 5, 1998, MacLellan stumbled badly when Progressive Conservative Leader John Hamm asked if he would resign if he failed to bring in a balanced budget. Instead of responding, MacLellan stared straight ahead and did not speak for seven seconds. MacLellan blamed the pause on rigid debate rules. This moment marked a turning point in a race that saw the Liberals barely retain power.

Results

Results by party

Results by region

Retiring incumbents
Liberal
Jay Abbass, Halifax Chebucto
Guy Brown, Cumberland South
Bob Carruthers, Hants East
Bill Gillis, Antigonish
Charles MacArthur, Inverness
John MacEachern, Cape Breton East
Russell MacNeil, Cape Breton Centre
Earle Rafuse, Annapolis
Dennis Richards, Cole Harbour-Eastern Passage
John Savage, Dartmouth South

Progressive Conservative
Donald P. McInnes, Pictou West

Nominated candidates
Legend
bold denotes party leader
† denotes an incumbent who is not running for re-election or was defeated in nomination contest

Valley

|-
|bgcolor=whitesmoke|Annapolis
||
|Laurie Montgomery3,44836.96%
|
|Basil Stewart 3,19834.28%
|
|John Kinsella2,46826.46%
|
|Bob Mann 2152.30%
||
|Earle Rafuse †
|-
|bgcolor=whitesmoke|Clare
||
|Wayne Gaudet2,95047.28%
|
|Guy LeBlanc2,57841.32%
|
|Vanessa Paddock71111.40%
|
|
||
|Wayne Gaudet
|-
|bgcolor=whitesmoke|Digby—Annapolis
|
|John Drish 2,23233.71%
||
|Gordon Balser2,46537.22%
|
|Steve Downes1,92529.07%
|
|
||
|Joseph H. Casey† 
|-
|bgcolor=whitesmoke|Hants West
|
|Debbi Bowes 2,59627.35%
||
|Ron Russell4,50747.48%
|
|Dana Harvey 2,39025.18%
|
|
||
|Ron Russell
|-
|bgcolor=whitesmoke|Kings North
|
|Jennifer Foster2,45727.09%
||
|George Archibald3,76041.45%
|
|Neil H. McNeil 2,85431.46%
|
|
||
|George Archibald
|-
|bgcolor=whitesmoke|Kings South
||
|Robbie Harrison3,65036.46%
|
|David Morse3,06930.65%
|
|Mary DeWolfe3,29332.89%
|
|
||
|Robbie Harrison
|-
|bgcolor=whitesmoke|Kings West
|
|Baden Thurber1,68420.60%
||
|George Moody5,07562.09%
|
|Jacquie DeMestral1,41417.30%
|
|
||
|George Moody
|}

South Shore

|-
|bgcolor=whitesmoke|Argyle
|
|Allister Surette1,89133.47%
||
|Neil LeBlanc3,02853.59%
|
|Diane E. Cromwell65111.52%
|
|Oscar Harris 801.42%
||
|Allister Surette
|-
|bgcolor=whitesmoke|Chester—St. Margaret's
|
|Jim Barkhouse3,15334.10%
||
|Hinrich Bitter-Suermann3,25635.22%
|
|Doris Maley2,83730.68%
|
|
||
|Jim Barkhouse
|-
|bgcolor=whitesmoke|Lunenburg
|
|Lila O'Connor3,09934.62%
||
|Michael Baker3,23136.10%
|
|Marilyn B. Crook2,62129.28%
|
|
||
|Lila O'Connor
|-
|bgcolor=whitesmoke|Lunenburg West
||
|Don Downe4,36447.95%
|
|Lou Centa2,02722.27%
|
|Eric Hustvedt2,71129.78%
|
|
||
|Don Downe
|-
|bgcolor=whitesmoke|Queens
|
|Tery Doucette 2,07231.42%
||
|John Leefe3,58254.32%
|
|Basil L. Giffin94014.26%
|
|
||
|John Leefe
|-
|bgcolor=whitesmoke|Shelburne
||
|Clifford Huskilson3,14438.57%
|
|Cecil O'Donnell2,83534.78%
|
|Derek Jones2,17326.66%
|
|
||
|Clifford Huskilson
|-
|bgcolor=whitesmoke|Yarmouth 
|
|Richie Hubbard2,21225.22%
|
|Alex McIntosh2,62929.97%
||
|John Deveau3,93144.81%
|
| 
||
|Richie Hubbard
|}

Fundy-Northeast

|-
|bgcolor=whitesmoke|Colchester—Musquodoboit Valley
|
|Dick Steeves1,58718.31%
||
|Brooke Taylor5,12259.08%
|
|Jim Harpell1,96022.61%
|
|
||
|Brooke Taylor
|-
|bgcolor=whitesmoke|Colchester North
||
|Ed Lorraine3,30139.13%
|
|Andy Williamson 2,51129.77%
|
|Janet Maybee2,62331.10%
|
|
||
|Ed Lorraine
|-
|bgcolor=whitesmoke|Cumberland North
|
|Russell Scott2,43827.89%
||
|Ernie Fage5,45162.35%
|
|Peter Stewart8549.77%
|
|
||
|Ernie Fage
|-
|bgcolor=whitesmoke|Cumberland South
|
|Mike Uberoi2,15326.81%
||
|Murray Scott4,71458.69%
|
|Sandy Graham 1,08913.56%
|
|James MacLeod760.95%
||
|Guy Brown †
|-
|bgcolor=whitesmoke|Hants East
|
|Jim W. Smith3,37735.32%
|
|Lawrin Armstrong2,01021.02%
||
|John MacDonell4,17543.66%
|
|
||
|Bob Carruthers †
|-
|bgcolor=whitesmoke|Truro—Bible Hill
|
|Eleanor Norrie2,56027.94%
||
|Jamie Muir3,85242.03%
|
|Ibel Scammell2,75230.03%
|
|
||
|Eleanor Norrie
|}

Central Halifax

|-
|bgcolor=whitesmoke|Halifax Bedford Basin
||
|Gerry Fogarty4,24640.10%
|
|Michael Maddalena 2,53023.89%
|
|Errol Gaum3,81336.01%
|
|
||
|Gerry Fogarty
|-
|bgcolor=whitesmoke|Halifax Chebucto
|
|Kenzie MacKinnon3,16535.51%
|
|Sean Phillips1,59017.84%
||
|Howard Epstein4,15846.65%
|
| 
||
|Jay Abbass †
|-
|bgcolor=whitesmoke|Halifax Citadel
|
|Ed Kinley4,37739.53%
|
|Tara Erskine2,17519.64%
||
|Peter Delefes4,41439.87%
|
|Art Canning1060.96%
||
|Ed Kinley
|-
|bgcolor=whitesmoke|Halifax Fairview
|
|Bob Britton2,59730.03%
|
|Brian Nash 1,40216.21%
||
|Eileen O'Connell4,64953.76%
|
|
||
|Eileen O'Connell
|-
|bgcolor=whitesmoke|Halifax Needham
|
|Gerry O'Malley2,50630.31%
|
|Artho Kartsaklis92411.18%
||
|Maureen MacDonald4,83758.51%
|
| 
||
|Gerry O'Malley
|}

Suburban Halifax

|-
|bgcolor=whitesmoke|Bedford—Fall River
||
|Francene Cosman4,20537.58%
|
|Peter Christie3,89234.79%
|
|Marvin Silver 3,09127.63%
|
|
||
|Francene Cosman
|-
|bgcolor=whitesmoke|Halifax Atlantic
|
|Darren Watts 2,81829.31%
|
|Jeff Campbell1,34013.94%
||
|Robert Chisholm5,36455.79%
|
|Golda M. Redden930.97%
||
|Robert Chisholm
|-
|bgcolor=whitesmoke|Sackville—Beaver Bank
|
|Bill MacDonald3,12833.16%
|
|Stephen Taylor2,48526.34%
||
|Rosemary Godin3,82140.50%
|
|
||
|Bill MacDonald
|-
|bgcolor=whitesmoke|Sackville—Cobequid
|
|Jack Brill2,13122.61%
|
|Rob Batherson1,38314.68%
||
|John Holm5,90962.71%
|
|
||
|John Holm
|-
|bgcolor=whitesmoke|Timberlea—Prospect
|
|Bruce Holland3,30833.34%
|
|Tom Robertson1,85218.67%
||
|Bill Estabrooks4,76247.99%
|
|
||
|Bruce Holland
|-
|}

Dartmouth/Cole Harbour/Eastern Shore

|-
|bgcolor=whitesmoke|Cole Harbour—Eastern Passage
|
|Randy Anstey3,30334.25%
|
|Linda DeGrace1,93120.02%
||
|Kevin Deveaux4,41145.73%
|
|
||
|Dennis Richards †
|-
|bgcolor=whitesmoke|Dartmouth—Cole Harbour 
|
|Alan Mitchell2,98633.98%
|
|Michael L. MacDonald2,08423.72%
||
|Darrell Dexter3,71742.30%
|
| 
||
|Alan Mitchell
|-
|bgcolor=whitesmoke|Dartmouth East
||
|Jim Smith 3,32640.92%
|
|Ralph Hawley1,84922.75%
|
|Viola Huntington2,95436.34%
|
|
||
|Jim Smith
|-
|bgcolor=whitesmoke|Dartmouth North
|
|Gloria McClusky2,57533.87%
|
|Mike Brownlow 2,00326.35%
||
|Jerry Pye3,02439.78%
|
| 
||
|Vacant
|-
|bgcolor=whitesmoke|Dartmouth South
|
|Bruce Hetherington3,16435.40%
|
|Allan Billard 2,09923.48%
||
|Don Chard3,67641.12%
|
|
||
|John Savage †
|-
|bgcolor=whitesmoke|Eastern Shore
||
|Keith Colwell3,29938.49%
|
|Greg Brown2,47228.84%
|
|Darren Richard2,80132.68%
|
|
||
|Keith Colwell
|-
|bgcolor=whitesmoke|Preston
|
|Wayne Adams1,54837.45%
|
|Ross D. Isenor 80919.57%
||
|Yvonne Atwell1,77742.99%
|
|
||
|Wayne Adams
|}

Central Nova

|-
|bgcolor=whitesmoke|Antigonish 
||
|Hyland Fraser 4,64941.55%
|
|Andrew MacNeil3,55431.76%
|
|Maurice Smith2,98626.69%
|
|
||
|Bill Gillis †
|-
|bgcolor=whitesmoke|Guysborough—Port Hawkesbury
||
|Ray White3,43842.81%
|
|Ron Chisholm2,71733.83%
|
|Wendy Panagopoulos1,87623.36%
|
|
||
|Ray White
|-
|bgcolor=whitesmoke|Pictou Centre
|
|Roseanne Skoke2,11423.68%
||
|John Hamm5,03756.42%
|
|Judy Hughes1,77619.89%
|
|
||
|John Hamm
|-
|bgcolor=whitesmoke|Pictou East
|
|Wayne Fraser2,20826.52%
||
|James DeWolfe3,81645.83%
|
|David MacKenzie2,30227.65%
|
|
||
|Wayne Fraser
|-
|bgcolor=whitesmoke|Pictou West
|
|Rob McDowell1,63319.89%
|
|Luke Young3,27339.86%
||
|Charlie Parker3,30640.26%
|
|
||
|Donald P. McInnes†
|}

Cape Breton

|-
|bgcolor=whitesmoke|Cape Breton Centre
|
|Steve Drake2,43528.61%
|
|Julien Frison5766.77%
||
|Frank Corbett5,49964.62%
|
|
||
|Russell MacNeil †
|-
|bgcolor=whitesmoke|Cape Breton East
|
|Clarence Routledge2,85930.06%
|
|Henry Boutillier1,65117.36%
||
|Reeves Matheson5,00252.59%
|
|
||
|John MacEachern †
|-
|bgcolor=whitesmoke|Cape Breton North
||
|Russell MacLellan 4,66650.13%
|
|Murray Johnston1,85319.91%
|
|Archie MacKinnon2,78929.96%
|
|
||
|Russell MacLellan
|-
|bgcolor=whitesmoke|Cape Breton Nova
||
|Paul MacEwan3,94453.98%
|
|Walter Hagen3124.27%
|
|Lou Surette3,05041.75%
|
|
||
|Paul MacEwan
|-
|bgcolor=whitesmoke|Cape Breton South
||
|Manning MacDonald5,11860.30%
|
|Anna Steele86110.14%
|
|Ed Murphy2,50829.55%
|
|
||
|Manning MacDonald
|-
|bgcolor=whitesmoke|Cape Breton—The Lakes
|
|Allan Henderson3,70742.29%
|
|Rollie Clarke4855.53%
||
|Helen MacDonald4,57352.17%
|
|
||
|Helen MacDonald
|-
|bgcolor=whitesmoke|Cape Breton West
||
|Russell MacKinnon4,52844.05%
|
|Alfie MacLeod2,81827.42%
|
|Brian Slaney2,93328.53%
|
|
||
|Alfie MacLeod
|-
|bgcolor=whitesmoke|Inverness
||
|Charlie MacDonald4,39647.83%
|
|Randy MacDonald1,95121.23%
|
|Maria Coady2,27424.74%
|
|Ed MacDonald5696.19%
||
|Charles MacArthur †
|-
|bgcolor=whitesmoke|Richmond
||
|Michel Samson3,23048.40%
|
|Frank Sutherland1,39220.86%
|
|Wilma Conrod2,05130.74%
|
|
||
|Vacant
|-
|bgcolor=whitesmoke|Victoria
||
|Kennie MacAskill2,40548.08%
|
|Dan Chiasson1,52430.47%
|
|Ruth Schneider88717.73%
|
|Stemer MacLeod 1863.72%
||
|Kennie MacAskill
|}

References

External links
1998 Campaign News Archived from Halifax Chronicle Herald

1998
1998 elections in Canada
1998 in Nova Scotia
March 1998 events in Canada